DRL Coachlines is a motor coach bus company operating in the Canadian province of Newfoundland and Labrador.

Wholly owned by DRL Group of Triton, NL, the bus company provided charter services before taking over Terra Transport Roadcruiser services on the island of Newfoundland in 1996.

Inter-city service
 Channel-Port aux Basques (Marine Atlantic ferry terminal)
 Doyles (Mountain Side General Store)
 Robinson's Junction (Midway Hotel)
 Stephenville (Stephenville International Airport)
 Corner Brook (Confederation Drive Circle K)
 Pasadena (Pasadena Convenience Plus)
 Deer Lake (Circle K)
 Hampden Junction (White Bay Convenience)
 Baie Verte Junction (Junction Inn)
 Springdale Junction (Butt's Esso)
 South Brook (Eddy's Restaurant)
 Badger (Loder's Irving)
 Grand Falls-Windsor (Highliner Inn)
 Bishop's Falls (Circle K)
 Lewisporte (Brittany Inns)
 Gander (Gander International Airport)
 Gambo (Needs Convenience)
 Eastport Junction (Splash n' Putt)
 Port Blandford (Blackmore's North Atlantic)
 Clarenville (Circle K)
 Goobies Junction (Circle K)
 Whitbourne Junction (Whitbourne Irving)
 Paradise (Crossroads Motel)
 St. John's (Memorial University of Newfoundland)

History
DRL subsequently expanded its charter services into neighbouring Nova Scotia and New Brunswick.  It also received a license to operate an inter-city bus route from Halifax to Yarmouth via Bridgewater on the South Shore, and was a contract school bus operator for the Annapolis Valley Regional School Board. Tickets are purchased on the bus and only cash is accepted.

Problems arose in the mid-2000s when the company lost its operating licenses for intercity, charter and school buses in Nova Scotia and New Brunswick after government transport regulators were informed of safety problems and maintenance issues resulting from DRL Coachlines service, in addition to tax problems that the company was facing.  DRL Coachlines has also faced several complaints about its inter-city bus services in Newfoundland and Labrador, where it has a monopoly.

The company suspended operations during the COVID-19 pandemic in 2020, but resumed operations on June 18, 2020.

References

External links
 DRL Coachlines Ltd. - official website
 DRL Coachline |VIA Rail- Schedule

Companies based in Newfoundland and Labrador
Intercity bus companies of Canada
Bus transport in Newfoundland and Labrador
Bus transport in Nova Scotia
Bus transport in New Brunswick